Helenium quadridentatum is a North American plant in the sunflower family, commonly known as longdisk sneezeweed. It is found in the southeastern and south-central United States (Alabama, Mississippi, Louisiana, Texas, Oklahoma) as well as Mexico (from Tamaulipas to Yucatán), Cuba, Guatemala, and Belize.

Leaves are sometimes broadly elliptical, other times very narrow and grass-like. One plant generally produces up to 50 flower heads, in a branching array. There are also 10-15 yellow ray flowers.

References

External links

Flora of North America
Plants described in 1792
quadridentatum